The sixth Sarawak state election was held between Friday, 27 September and Saturday, 28 September 1991. This election elected 56 state representatives into the Sarawak State Assembly. This election saw 72.8% of the eligible voters to cast their votes.

Sarawak Barisan Nasional (BN) fielded candidates for all 56 seats, followed by Sarawak Dayak People's Party (PBDS) (34 seats), Parti Negara Rakyat Sarawak (NEGARA) (28 seats), Democratic Action Party (DAP) (18 seats), and Persatuan Rakyat Malaysia Sarawak (PERMAS) (12 seats). There were 19 independents vying for 16 seats. A total of 167 candidates were successfully nominated on the nomination day.

After the 1987 Ming Court Affair, PERMAS which was founded by Abdul Rahman Ya'kub (the uncle of Abdul Taib Mahmud) continued his final bid with PBDS in this election to topple the Taib led Sarawak BN. Before this, PERMAS and PBDS lost narrowly in the 1987 state election. However, Sarawak BN won with a larger majority this time. PERMAS won none of the seats in this election and was dissolved not long after in 1991.

Background
Sarawak is the largest state in Malaysia. The population of the state roughly consists of: 30% Iban people, 30% Malaysian Chinese, 25% Malay and Melanau people, and 7% of other indigenous people. Meanwhile, the Iban, Bidayuh, and other indigenous people are collectively known as the Dayak people. Since 1970, Sarawak has been ruled by the Barisan Nasional (BN) coalition which consisting of: Parti Pesaka Bumiputera Bersatu (PBB), Sarawak National Party (SNAP), and Sarawak United Peoples' Party (SUPP). Roughly speaking, PBB represents the Malay/Melanau people, SUPP represents the Chinese, and SNAP represents the Dayak people. Many Dayaks are members of PBB and SUPP.

Abdul Rahman Ya'kub was the chief minister of Sarawak from 1970 until 1981. He was succeeded by his nephew Abdul Taib Mahmud in 1981. During the 1987 Sarawak state election, an alliance between PBDS and Sarawak Malaysian People's Association (PERMAS) nearly led to the fall of Sarawak BN led by chief minister Taib Mahmud. However, Taib was able to maintain his power after the election, aided by eight opposition state assemblymen who defected to the BN side, thus securing a strong majority in the Sarawak State Legislative Assembly. But in 1990 Malaysian general election, PBDS, which remained with the BN coalition at the federal level, won four parliamentary seats. Another four independents backed by the party also won their seats, thus bringing a total of eight parliamentarians under PBDS control out of 25 parliamentary seats in Sarawak. During the 1985 state election in the neighbouring state of Sabah, the Bajau/Malay-dominated Sabah People's United Front (BERJAYA) was ousted from power and was replaced by the Kadazan-dominated Parti Bersatu Sabah (PBS). Therefore, there were high hopes from political analysts that the Dayak-based Parti Bansa Dayak Sarawak (PBDS) would topple the Malay/Melanau-dominated PBB because Sarawak shared a similar ethnic-based electoral history with Sabah since the formation of Malaysia.

Electoral system
Before the 1991 election, Election Commission of Malaysia had redrawn the electoral boundaries of Sarawak, increasing the number of state assembly seats from 48 to 56. With the new boundaries, there were 18 Malay/Melanau constituencies, 17 Iban-majority seats, 11 Chinese-majority seats, 5 Bidayuh seats, 2 Orang Ulu seats and 3 mixed seats. Incumbent chief minister Taib Mahmud dissolved the state assembly in September 1991.

Parties and leaders

Government
The Sarawak BN ruling coalition consisted of PBB, SNAP, and SUPP. In July 1991, three notable PERMAS personalities withdrew from the party and announced their support for PBB. Just before the election, the seats composition for BN was: 21 for PBB, 11 for SUPP, and 5 for SNAP. The seats negotiations amongst the component parties in BN did not go smoothly. SNAP demanded 17 seats because it wanted to reclaim all the seats that was lost to PBDS in the 1983 and 1987. PBB, the largest component party of the Sarawak BN coalition, had the final say in the seat allocation. The party was the major beneficiary from PBDS and PERMAS defections. They did not give the seats back to SNAP. PBB leaders decided to give a warning that if SNAP continued to raise the issue of seat allocations in the public, SNAP would get only five seats in this election, instead of eight. This measure effectively silenced SNAP and the final seat allocation for the component parties were: PBB given 31 seats, SUPP 17 seats, and SNAP 8 seats. In fact, SNAP was contesting only for 7 seats because for the seat of Bukit Begunan, SNAP was using a "loan" candidate from PBB.

Opposition
Just before the state election, the opposition only had 11 seats: seven seats from PBDS and four from PERMAS. PBDS fielded 34 candidates in this election, including seven Chinese. PERMAS fielded 11 candidates in Malay/Melanau areas, the Democratic Action Party (DAP) fielded 18 candidates, and the Sarawak People's National Party (Parti NEGARA) fielded 28 candidates. Fourteen independents participated in the election. Most of the contests were between PBDS and BN, and DAP against SUPP.

PBDS hoped to repeat their victories during the 1987 state election by exploiting Dayak nationalism. By winning in this election, they also hoped to install a Dayak chief minister because the Iban people is the largest ethnic group in Sarawak. This was known as "Project Chief Minister 1992" because PBDS was anticipating the election to be held in 1992. Meanwhile, DAP hoped that they could at least win a single state assembly seat in the Chinese-dominated parliamentary seats of Sibu and Bandar Kuching. DAP put high hopes on the state assembly seats of Bawang Assan in Sibu and Batu Lintang in Kuching. DAP first won the Bandar Kuching parliamentary seat in 1982 and retained the seat in the 1986 and 1990 parliamentary elections. DAP won the Sibu parliamentary seat for one term in 1982 and Lanang in 1990. However, DAP had not won any state assembly seats since its inception in Sarawak in 1978. PBDS tried to cooperate with DAP. However, PBDS, as part of the national BN coalition, was opposed by the national BN chairman on any possibilities of such cooperation. DAP and PBDS, however, reached an agreement that they would contest the Repok and Meradong constituencies in Sarikei and Bintangor respectively.

Campaign

Barisan Nasional
The press, controlled by the BN parties, covered positively about BN candidates while reporting negatively about the opposition. Parti NEGARA was mocked by Sarawak BN as "mosquito" party. The credibility of Parti NEGARA was damaged when its president had to go to court to justify his standing as the president of the party. Parti NEGARA was speculated to receive financial backing from PBS government in Sabah in order to contest against BN.

BN campaigned on the continuation of development policy that can guarantee a "better future for all". BN also had more money and resources when compared to the opposition in terms of printed material, contributions, and campaign workers. SUPP, a component party of BN, appealed to the Chinese that a vote for SUPP is a guarantee for "Chinese participation in government". Chan Seng Khai, a SUPP candidate contesting for the Batu Lintang state assembly seat, was an underdog at the beginning of the campaign period. He lost to Sim Kwang Yang, a DAP parliamentarian for Bandar Kuching in 1990 parliamentary elections. However, when Sarawak BN pledged RM 60 million for upgrading the drainage system in Kuching, the Chinese voters decided to support SUPP for the continuation of development. Meanwhile, in Sibu, a relative newcomer from SUPP, Wong Soon Koh (who was related to SUPP chairman Wong Soon Kai) emphasized that only a Sarawak BN government is able to carry out its pledges. He stated that DAP could only "bark like a dog and make empty promises". Soon Koh lost to David Tiong from PERMAS in the 1987 state elections for the constituency of Igan. Despite losing, Soon Koh continued his community services and contested for Bawang Assan constituency in this election. SUPP also portrayed Ling Sie Ming, a DAP parliamentarian for Sibu from 1982 to 1986 as ineffective. SUPP also successfully portrayed DAP as an outsider party from Peninsular Malaysia which has no interest in Sarawak. Chief minister Taib also barred Tengku Razaleigh Hamzah (leader of Semangat 46) from entering Sarawak campaigning for DAP during the state election.

Opposition parties
PBDS promoted Dayak nationalism by claiming that the Dayaks was sidelined by Malay/Melanau and Chinese political elites. PBDS also campaigned against BN excessive logging policies and called for respect for Dayak native land laws. However, PBDS only contested for 24 Dayak majority seats. Had it even won all the seats, PBDS would still be five seats short of a simple majority to form the state government. Besides, the "Project Chief Minister 1992" did not make sense when PBDS party president Leo Moggie was still a federal cabinet minister and did not contest for any state assembly seats in Sarawak. Besides, PBDS did not announce the chief minister nominee if they swept to power in this election. PBDS also tried to appeal to the Chinese by setting up Chinese Affairs Consultative Committee (CACC), allowing Chinese input into PBDS's decision-making process. PBDS also promised RM 5 million yearly for Chinese independent high schools. However, these two efforts were unsuccessful because PBDS did not allow non-Dayaks to become members. The print media also launched a successful campaign against PBDS by saying that PBDS membership requirement showed that it is a racial party and will not protect Chinese interests. BN also said that PBDS Dayak nationalism was only for the Iban people, as the Iban people dominated the PBDS party. The aim is to create a divide between the Ibans and the other Dayak ethnic groups in the party. The BN federal ministers decided to campaign for Sarawak BN instead of PBDS even though PBDS is also a member of the federal BN coalition. This further undermined the credibility of PBDS.

Meanwhile, DAP campaigned so that the voters would allow DAP to break the "egg" which means "zero" in Chinese context. This was because DAP always returned empty-handed in previous state elections. DAP hoped that the Chinese would return at least one state assemblyman for DAP. DAP called the SUPP a "tycoon" party which serves only the interests of big businesses and towkays instead of the people. DAP also portrayed SUPP as an arrogant party and Sarawak BN as "corrupted". Therefore, a strong opposition is needed to keep the ruling government in check.

Results
On the morning of 29 September 1991, Sarawak BN had made a clean sweep of all the state assembly seats except for seven seats won by PBDS. Parti NEGARA, PERMAS, and DAP returned empty-handed. Senior PBDS leaders such as Jawie Masing, who stood for Pakan, and Edmund Langgu, who stood for Krian, were defeated by newcomers from Sarawak BN. However, PBDS deputy president Daniel Tajem was able to win back his old seat of Bukit Begunan which he has lost in the 1987 elections. Another two PBDS members, Harrison Ngau Laing and Richard Riot Jaem also lost their seats to BN. James Jemut Masing, the senior vice-president of PBDS was a consistent performer in this election. He increased his majority in the constituency of Baleh. The only successful PBDS Chinese candidate was Sng Chee Hua at Pelagus. James Masing, surprised by the scale of the PBDS defeat in this election, stated that,"I am baffled. Perhaps we haven't explained the issues enough or they (the Dayak voters) are quite happy with the government". However, PBDS voters share increased from 17.63% in 1987 to 21.48% in 1991.

For DAP, this election was another disappointment. DAP had lost significantly to SUPP in Bawang Assan and Batu Lintang. Several of the DAP candidates in rural areas even lost their deposits. The Sarawak Chinese viewed the vote for DAP is a "wasted vote" because resource allocations are decided by the state government based in Kuching. Therefore, a vote for SUPP is needed to protect Chinese community and business interests. On the other hand, at parliamentary level, DAP parliamentarians were elected as a "protest vote" against the federal BN coalition which was perceived as "anti-Chinese". The only bright spot for DAP was at the Padungan state constituency when a newcomer named Dominique Ng Kim Ho put up a good fight against a popular SUPP candidate, Song Swee Guan. Dominique gained more than half of Song's total votes.

Summary

Results by constituency
The Sarawak BN won a total 49 out of 56 seats in the state assembly, including two uncontested seats. The remaining seats were won by PBDS.

On the nomination day, Sarawak BN won two uncontested seats, namely N.3 Pantai Damai and N.24 Saribas.

The full list of elected representatives is shown below:

Aftermath
After the election, PBDS decided rejoin Sarawak BN without any conditions. Initially, chief minister Taib was skeptical about PBDS intentions. SNAP, a component party in Sarawak BN, also expressed strong opposition against the readmission of PBDS into the BN fold. PBDS, a splinter party from SNAP, have been the rival party of SNAP since 1983. Prime minister Mahathir Mohamad, who is also federal BN chairman, was unhappy about the status of PBDS which was part of government and part of opposition at the same time. Both Mahathir and Taib were keen to readmit PBDS to gain the remaining faction of Dayak support. However, SUPP welcomed the addition of PBDS into Sarawak BN. SUPP saw this move as a necessary step to bolster the Dayak support towards SUPP, thus strengthening the status of SUPP in Sarawak BN coalition. Negotiations did not start until 1992 when PBDS proved its sincerity in rejoining Sarawak BN. PBDS also agreed that all the parliamentary and state assembly seat allocations will be left to the Sarawak BN to decide. A memorandum of understanding was signed between PBDS and Sarawak BN. PBDS was later officially admitted into Sarawak BN on 1 June 1994. From now on, PBDS could no longer criticize BN on issues that worked against the Dayaks.

After this election, PERMAS was relegated "mosquito party" status. With the readmission of PBDS into BN fold in 1994, chief minister Taib ruled Sarawak without any opposition in the state assembly.

References

1991
1991 elections in Malaysia